FRSB may refer to:
 the Financial Reporting Standards Board, in New Zealand
 a Fellow of the Royal Society of Biology, in the United Kingdom
 Fundraising Standards Board, the independent regulator for charity fundraising in the UK since 2007